19 is a 2001 Japanese drama film written and directed by Kazushi Watanabe. It was released on 14 July 2001.

Cast
 as Usami
Kazushi Watanabe
Masashi Endō
Nachi Nozawa
Ryo Shinmyo
Takeo Noro

Reception
Tom Mes of Midnight Eye wrote that the film "has less to do with social comment than with delivering an exercise in consistency."

References

External links

2001 drama films
2001 films
Japanese drama films
2000s Japanese films